Maël Durand de Gevigney (born 21 September 1999) is a French professional footballer who plays as a centre-back for French  club Nîmes.

Career
Durand de Gevigney is a youth product of his local club Feucherolles USA, AS Meudon, Drancy, and Versailles. He began his senior career with Versailles in 2019, and helped them achieve promotion into the Championnat National 2 in his second season with them, and was thereafter named their captain. He transferred to Nîmes on 30 June 2022, signing his first professional contract. He made his professional debut with Nîmes as a late substitute in a 1–0 Ligue 2 loss to Caen on 30 July 2022.

References

External links
 
 Ligue 2 profile

1999 births
Living people
Footballers from Yvelines
French footballers
Association football defenders
FC Lorient players
Nîmes Olympique players
Ligue 2 players
Championnat National 2 players
Championnat National 3 players